Dirty Work is a comedy series which debuted in 2012 and stars Jamie Clayton, Hank Harris and Mary Lynn Rajskub.  The series is produced by Fourth Wall Studios for their proprietary RIDES.TV platform.

Plot
The comedic adventures of three Los Angelenos working in the crime scene clean up business.

Cast
 Jamie Clayton as Michelle
 Mary Lynn Rajskub as Roxy 
 Matt Jones as Hummy
 Hank Harris as Pete
 Moira Quirk as Dikran
 Matt Jones as Hummy

References

External links
 
 

Emmy Award-winning programs
American comedy web series
Transgender-related television shows